Marc Lévy may refer to:

 Marc Levy (born 1961), French novelist
 Marc Lévy (footballer) (born 1961), French former football goalkeeper